Dead Horse, Dead Horses, or Deadhorse may refer to

Places
Dead Horse Bay, in Brooklyn, New York, U.S.
Dead Horse Camp, in South America
Dead Horse Peak in Utah, U.S.
Dead Horse Point State Park in Utah, U.S.
Dead Horse Ranch State Park in Arizona, U.S.
Deadhorse, Alaska, a town in the United States
White Pass Trail, also called "Dead Horse Trail"
Dead Horse Bay, in Brooklyn, New South Wales, Australia.

Arts, entertainment, and media

Comics
Deadhorse, a comic book series written by Eric Grissom, Phil Sloan, Marissa Louise, and David Halvorson, published by Frankenstein's Daughter, and set in Deadhorse, Alaska

Music

Groups
 Dead Horse (band), an American thrash metal band
Dead Horse One, a neo-psychedelic/shoegaze band based in France
 The Dead Horses, the backup band for Ryan Bingham

Albums
 Dead Horse (album), a 2005 album by Cassetteboy
A Dead Horse, a 1989 album by The Golden Palominos
Dead Horses, a 2013 album by Evergreen Terrace
The Dead Horse EP, a 2007 remix EP by Junior Boys

Songs
 "Dead Horse" (song), a 1991 Guns N' Roses song

See also
Flogging a dead horse (disambiguation)
Flogging a dead horse, an idiom
Dark Horse (disambiguation)